King David School(s) can refer to one or more of the following Jewish day schools:

 Australia
King David School, Melbourne

 Canada
King David School, Vancouver

 England
King David School, Birmingham
King David School, Liverpool
King David High School, Manchester

 South Africa
King David Schools, Johannesburg